Timbo District was one of the two original districts of Rivercess County, Liberia.

References

Districts of Liberia
Rivercess County